Burdens is a debut album of the Portuguese gothic metal band Ava Inferi. It was released in January 2006 by Season of Mist.

"The title describes the collective soul of the band, with its clear roots referring to the past and its troubled paths. Other titles included on this album are [...] rooted in the essences of pain and fear, as well as the eerie and the unknown"
.

Track listing
 "Ava Inferi" – 4:19
 "The Shrine" – 0:33
 "A Glimpse of Sanity" – 7:06
 "The Wings of Emptiness" – 5:35
 "Sinisters" – 9:36
 "Vultos" – 4:50
 "Fate of Mountains" – 8:38

Credits

Band members
 Carmen Susana Simões — vocals
 Rune Eriksen - electric and clean guitars, effects
 Jaime S. Ferreira - bass
 João Samora (Bandido) - drums and percussion

Session musicians
 Miguel Do Vale - piano on 1, 2
 Nuno Roberto - Portuguese guitar on 5, acoustic rhythm on 7

Production
 Piano recorded at My Home Your Tomb Studio, Almada, Portugal.
 Everything else recorded between June 20 - July 8, 2005 at Top Room Studio, Norway.
 Mixed between July 12–18, 2005 by Börge Finstad (BBF) and Rune Eriksen.
 All songs by Rune Eriksen, lyrics by Carmen Susana Simões.

Other
 Artworks by Nuno Roberto and João Monteiro.

References

External links
 Interview with Ava Inferi

2006 debut albums
Ava Inferi albums
Season of Mist albums